The discography of American rapper Cuban Link.

Albums

Mixtapes

Album/mixtape track listing

Terror Squad: The Album (1999) 
In for Life" ft. Big Pun, Triple Seis, Prospect, Cuban Link & Fat Joe
Pass the Glock ft. Big Pun, Fat Joe, Prospect, Triple Seis, Cuban Link & Armageddon
'99 Live ft. Prospect
What'cha Gon' Do? ft. Big Pun
Triple Threat ft. Big Pun, Armageddon & Cuban Link
War ft. Triple Seis
Bring It On ft. Fat Joe
As the World Turns ft. Cuban Link, Tony Sunshine, Triple Seis & Prospect
Gimme Dat ft. Armageddon
Feelin' This ft. Armageddon, Prospect & Big Pun
All Around the World ft. Cuban Link
Tell Me What U Want ft. Fat Joe, Armageddon, Cuban Link & Tony Sunshine
Rudeboy Salute ft. Fat Joe, Big Pun & Buju Banton
My Kinda Girls ft. Tony Sunshine & Cuban Link
Payin' Dues ft. Armageddon & Keith Nut
www.thatsmyshit.com ft. Fat Joe, Triple Seis & The Bleach Brothers

24K (2000) 
The Arrival
90 Miles and Swimming
GQ's Skit
For My Real Ni**az
Project Party ft. Sunkiss
Freak Out ft. Angie Martinez
Still Tellin Lies ft. Tony Sunshine
Spik-N-Spanish Skit
Play How You Want ft. P!nk
24 Karat
Sing-Sing Skit
Toe To Toe ft. Big Pun
Men Of Business ft. Noreaga, Kool G. Rap, M.O.P. & Lord Tariq
Murda Murda ft. Ja Rule
Cuban Sandwich ft. Remy Ma & Lo-Key
Cheat On Her ft. Big Pun & Carl Thomas
Lil Link Skit
Hey Mama ft. Tony Sunshine
Dirty Old Men Skit
Taste Of Pastry ft. Prospect, Triple Seis, & Tony Sunshine
Cartel ft.  Billy Klubs, Raze Korleone, Buck 50, Reif Hustle & Don Dinero
Why Me ft. Fat Joe
Dedication Skit
Flowers for the Dead ft. D'Mingo
(Bonus Track)
Skit
It's Ok ft. Figgarraw (Fat Joe & DJ Kay Slay Diss)

Cuban Link: Broken Chains (2002) 
Intro
Scarface II
Toe 2 Toe
Welcome to CLK
Cuban Skit
Real Ni**az
Men of Buziness
Murda Murda
Glamour Life
Cuban Skit
Built Like That
Cuban Skit
90 Miles
Cuban Skit
Why Me
As Tha World Turns
Cuban Skit
Hidden Hand
Slam Pit
Triple Threat
Cuban Skit
All Around Tha World
Cuban Skit
Pimpen
Exclusive Interview
Triz
Tell Me Whut U Want
Tellin Lies
Sugar Daddy
Dirty Old Man Skit
Whut It Is
Someone To Hold
Hey Momma
Player (R.I.P.)
Its So hard (R.I.P. Pun)
100 (R.I.P. Pun)
How We Roll (R.I.P. Pun)
Flowers For the Dead

Broken Chains 2: Chainsaw Massacre (2004) 
Bronx Tale Intro
Guess Who's Back
Cuban's Coming For You Skit
Hit 'Em Up
When The Shit Goes Down ft. Herinbone & Figgaraw
Sangre ft Don Chezina & TNT
Murderers ft L.G.
L.G. Freestyle
Toe To Toe Skit
Hotel
New York To California ft. Lucky
Save Me Some Skit
Nasty Girl
Holla Skit
Teach You How To Hump ft Figgaraw
I Wanna Know ft Figgaraw & Marvin
Chi Chi Skit
Monkey Dance ft. Monkey
Lock Down Skit
Run This City ft. Figgaraw
Destiny Skit
See What I See ft 2Pac
Don't Move Skit
Y'all Don't Want It ft Figgaraw
Shakedown ft. Swizz Beats
 Phat Note Freestyle
Hold That ft G.S.
Freestyle - Verse
Outro/Letter To Pun

Chain Reaction (2005) 
My Story (Intro)
Chain Reaction
No Mercy
Comin Home With Me ft. Avant
Riderz ft. Cap-1
Scandalous ft. Don Omar
Sugar Daddy ft. Mya
Tonight's The Night
Private Party ft. Big Humma
Dirty Karaoke Skit
I Need To Know
No Falla ft. Zion
Shakedown ft. Swizz Beatz
Talk About It ft. Jadakiss
Life Goes On ft. Syleena Johnson
Prison Wisdom (Interlude)
Letter To Pun

Man On Fire Mixtape (2005) 
Intro
Album Sampler
Clickity Clack
Everyone Knows What's Coming Skit
Man On Fire ft J. Benjamin
Bleed
Confessions Skit
Time
Chips Are Down
Informer Skit
Smell A Rat
Hot Wings Skit
Hoe Town ft Monkey & Casual
Whatta We Have Here ft Peedi Crack
Keep It In The Family ft Baby Pun
Living In The City ft Figgaraw & Triple Seis
Apple Is Rotten ft. Fed Note
Heaven Or Hell Skit
The World (Scarface)
From MIA To NY ft D-Cell
Where's My Money Skit
Go Hoin' For Me
New York
Swimmin' With Sharks ft Rell
Let Me Love You Remix ft Mario
Final Words Outro

Bang Bang Boogie: The Machine Vol. 1 (2007) 
Intro
Bang Bang Boogie Anthem
Rollin, Rydin
Murdergram
Drop Skit1
Ghost Town
Drop Skit2
Your Not Hood - Suicide
50 Cent Co-Sign
Ya Over
Dick Rydas
Death Poetry
Limelight
Makin Moves
Reservoir Dogs
On The Block
Money Music
Nuthin On Me
Keep It On The Low
Attempt Murder
Bang Out
Bronx Quran
Outro

Bang Bang Boogie: The X-Files "No Mercy For The Weak" (2008) 
Scarface Intro
Money
Philly 2 Ny
Base's Loaded
Got Ya Back
X-Files
Skit
Are You My Lady
All Mighty Dollar
Exclusive Freestyle
We Got The Brown
Want My Spot Back
Poppin In The Hood
Where U At?
My Lil Nigga
Cubans money
Ride That 5
We Some Riders
Outro

Singles

Guest appearances

Unreleased tracks (alphabetical order)
Ain't No Sunshine ft. Tony Sunshine
All I Need ft. Rican
Asi Yo Soy ft. Zaturnom.,
Big Shots ft. One Solo & Figgaraw
Block Start ft. Delio & Misterio
BMF Remix ft. Pablo Escobar & Armaredda
Brothers ft. Nino Bless, Krutch, & Big Lou
BX (Remix) ft. Darq
Chips Are Down
Cock Back & Let Em Spray ft. Rob Lebron
Dance
Dancin & Groovin
DJ Camilo freestyle ft. Triple Seis
Down With You
Excuse Me Father ft. One Solo
Flashlight (Look Around) ft. Illfamed
Freestyle Over Snoop Beat
Freestyle Over Xzibit's "Speed Of Light" ft. Big Pun & Armageddon
Go On ft. Squabble
Hijo De La Calle ft. Chikitin
Heavy Chains ft. Zay & Nat Turner
Hennessey ft. Jammer & Monkey
He's Snitchin ft. Jay Benjamins
Hit Em Up II
I Miss You
Im Still Here ft. Zay
Im That Gangsta ft. One Solo
Ima Start A Riot ft. Hard Hitta
In Thugs We Trust ft. K-Rouger & Layzie Bone
It's Not A Game ft. Calico
Lace Up ft. Figgaraw
Let It Go ft. Jay Benjamins & Gennessee
Let The Dollars Circulate ft. Poe Rilla
Lets Make Love ft. Deep Side
Libertad ft. Mely Mel & Poe Rilla
Long Way To Go ft. Mass Hurrikanes
Moment Of Truth ft. Remy Ma & Triple Seis
My Lady ft. James Ramsey
Nadie Como Yo ft. Arianna Puello
No Hay ft. Algenis & Nengo Flow
No Mercy ft. Game
No Respect ft. MC Ceja
No Te Culpare ft. Richie Rivera
Nos Tienen Miedo ft. Kastro, Temperamento, Noztra, Reychesta Secret Weapon, Aro Sanchez, Eddy Ness, Luciano, Poe Rilla, & Nox
Nos Tienen Miedo II ft. Por Rilla, Mely Mel, El Pope, Zaturno, Reychesta, Pato Pooh, K. Sikario, & Temperamento
Orgullo Latino ft. Hustla
Quiet Storm [produced by Acestar]
Pimpen Ain't Easy ft. Willie Stubz
Scarface II
Shawty What Your Name Is ft. Trey Songz
Somos Calle ft. Leroy
Somos Latinos ft. Nubia
Ready To roll ft. Phame aka Latin Stax
Real Recognize Real
Shake Dat Thang ft. D.C.
Take A Look At Me Now
Take It In Blood ft. Zay
Thank You Mi Amor ft. Crystal Sierra
The Block Is Hot ft. Poe Rilla, S1, Zay, & Mysonne
The Bronx Is Back ft. Remy Ma, Mysonne, Lord Tariq, Superb, Craze-A 730, Night, MV, & Big Will
This Is How We Roll ft. O-Mega
U Know Ima Ryda ft. D-Cell
Up In Smoke ft. Triple Seis
Up In The Club ft. Elan Luz Rivera
Walking In The Rain ft. J-Loc
We Out To Get Paid ft. Bimbo
Welcome To CLK
What You Gonna Do ft. Don Omar & Nengo Flow
Where You At ft. Don Dinero
Y'all Don't Want It ft. Figgaraw
You Ain't No Gangsta ft. Big Lou
You Know Whats Up (Remix) ft. Donnell Jones, Xzibit, Pharaoh Monch, 50 Cent, Fat Joe, & Treach
You're Not Hood (DJ Khalid & Rick Ross Diss) ft. Big Will
You've Been Robbed (Fat Joe Diss)

References

External links
 Cuban Link official Hi5 

Hip hop discographies
Discographies of American artists